Mumbi is a name of Kenyan origin that may refer to:
Mumbi Macharia (born 1997), Kenyan spoken-word poet
Mumbi Maina (born 1985), Kenyan actress
Julia Mumbi Muraga (born 1984), Kenyan long-distance runner
Ruth Mumbi (born 1980), Kenyan human rights activist
Sipho Mumbi (born 1983), retired Zambian footballer

See also
Mumbi, Kikuyu mythological female figure

Kenyan names
Zambian names
Bemba-language surnames